Jesús Posse (born 2 April 1966) is a Uruguayan rower. He competed at the 1988 Summer Olympics and the 1992 Summer Olympics.

References

External links
 

1966 births
Living people
People from Soriano Department
Uruguayan male rowers
Olympic rowers of Uruguay
Rowers at the 1988 Summer Olympics
Rowers at the 1992 Summer Olympics
Place of birth missing (living people)
Pan American Games medalists in rowing
Pan American Games gold medalists for Uruguay
Rowers at the 1987 Pan American Games
Medalists at the 1987 Pan American Games
20th-century Uruguayan people